Fry jacks are a traditional dish in Belizean cuisine. They are deep-fried dough pieces served for breakfast, and can be shaped as circles or triangles.

Overview
Fry jacks are not unique to Belize. Other names are used in various countries around the world including beignets in New Orleans (United States), sopaipillas in Mexico, other Latin American countries and the Southwestern United States, or simply ‘fried dough’.

Preparation begins with flour and other ingredients, typically including baking powder, salt, vegetable oil and water. The mix is then pan-cooked. Preparation involves creating the dough and then allowing it time to proof, or rise. Once the dough has risen, the dough is rolled out and then cut into strips or pieces. After being pan-cooked in oil, they may be topped with ingredients such as jam, beans or cheese.

See also

 Biscuit
 List of fried dough foods
 Pancake
 Poori

References

Further reading
 S. (2013, April 25). Fry Jacks(Belize). Fry Jacks Belize) Recipe. Retrieved from http://www.food.com/recipe/fry-jacks-belize-499428
 Flavors of Belize, Belize Cooking, Belize Recipes. (n.d.). Flavors of Belize, Belize Cooking, Belize Recipes. Retrieved from http://www.flavorsofbelize.com/#!fry-jacks/c11yk 
 Kessler, A. (n.d.). Authentic Belizean Recipes – Fry Jacks. Live in Belize Retire in Belize Belize LifeStyle. Retrieved from http://belizelifestyle.com/authentic-belizean-recipes-fry-jacks/
 A. (n.d.). Calories in Fry Jacks. SparkRecipes. Retrieved from https://archive.today/20131204194953/http://recipes.sparkpeople.com/recipe-calories.asp?recipe=315004
 How to Make Belizean Fry Jacks | Belize Travel Blog. (n.d.). Belize Travel Blog. Retrieved from https://web.archive.org/web/20131217224729/http://belize-travel-blog.chaacreek.com/2012/08/how-to-make-belizean-fry-jacks/

Belizean cuisine
National dishes